Samba district is a district in the Indian Union territory of Jammu and Kashmir formed in 2006. Before its formation, this area was part of Jammu district and Kathua district.

Geography
The district covers Samba town and adjoining tehsils: Bari Brahmana, Vijay Pur and Ghagwal. The district is separated at some point  from the Jammu district by "Purmandal Bridge". Samba is situated on the bank of Basantar River. At one side samba has its boundary with Pakistan.

Samba district consists of Eight blocks: Samba, Vijay Pur, Purmandal, Bari Brahmana, Nud, Rajpura, Sumb and Ghagwal. Each block consists of GREF panchayats. The biggest village is Rajpura.

History
Samba was reportedly established in 1400 AD. It came under the suzerainty of Jammu in 1816 A.D., while it was annexed by Raja Gulab Singh in 1846 A.D. Historically Samba consisted of 22 towns (also known as Mandi), each headed by a separate family. Prior to 1947, Samba was a tehsil. Samba became a district in 2006.

Politics
Samba District has three assembly constituencies: Samba , Vijaypur and Ramgarh(newly created constituency by delimitation commission). Both are part of Jammu (Lok Sabha constituency).

Demographics

According to the 2011 census, Samba District had a population of 318,898, roughly equal to The Bahamas. It is the 568th largest in India (of 640). Its population growth rate over the decade of 2001 to 2011 was 16.9%. Samba has a sex ratio of 886 females for every 1,000 males, and a literacy rate of 81.4%.

Religion

Samba district has an overwhelming Hindu majority, spread among Muslims, Sikhs, and others are the minority in the Samba district.

Languages 
At the time of the 2011 census, 84.53% of the population spoke Dogri, 4.95% Punjabi, 4.32% Gojri and 2.72% Hindi as their first language.

Festivals & Fairs of Samba

Rath Kharda Mela 
An eight day fair is organised in Narsingh and Annapurna Temple in Ghagwal of Samba district of Jammu division. This fair involves taking out procession of deity on a chariot. Hence named Rath Kharda Mela. Thousands of devotees are drawn from neighbouring states of Punjab and Himachal Pradesh and also other parts of Jammu region. People from hilly areas of Jammu like: Basohli, Doda, Kishtwar, Bani, Dudu Basantgarh put stalls in this fair and sell the handicrafts and woolen items like Pattus, blankets & shawls.

During this fair, the temple is decorated with flowers and lights. Devotees visit the temple and pay obeisance to the main deity, Bhagwan Narsimha. A Bhandara is also organised for the devotees. Local farmers sow their fields in the name of Bhagwan Narsimha and while harvesting their crops offer a part of it to the temple during this fair.

Besides Ghagwal, Rath Kharda Mela is also held at other places of Jammu division like: Ramgarh tehsil of Udhampur district, Parnala village in Billawar tehsil and Hatli village in Kathua.

Famous People
 Alla Rakha Indian Classical Musician and tabla player
 Raja Suchet Singh  to whom the District also owes the famous Samba fort. In 1846 A.D it was annexed to J&K by Maharaja Gulab Singh making it an integral part of the state.

Villages
 

Rehian

References

External links
 Official website of Samba district in Jammu and Kashmir
 Samba district on OpenStreetMap

 
Districts of Jammu and Kashmir